Archibald "Archie" Macpherson (born 1937) is a Scottish football commentator and author.

He has been commentating on Scottish football, via both radio and television, for over four decades.

Early life 

Macpherson was born and raised in the Shettleston area of Glasgow. His father had played as a centre forward for Shettleston, Dalry Thistle and Largs Thistle.

Broadcasting career 

Macpherson has worked for the BBC, STV, Eurosport, Setanta Sports, Radio Clyde and Talksport although he initially struggled to gain a foothold in broadcasting. Indeed, his first job was as a teacher where he supplemented his income by getting short stories published in local newspapers. Such efforts paid off and helped Archie gain his initial big break at the BBC. He continued to work as a teacher until 1969 when he joined the BBC on a full-time basis and remained with the corporation until 1990.

Popular perception 

Macpherson has made his own personal appearances within Scottish popular culture.  Famously he once appeared on Rikki Fulton's Scotch and Wry (a prominent comedy sketch show screened by BBC Scotland) being mistaken for former University Challenge host Bamber Gascoigne. In the film adaptation of Irvine Welsh's cult novel Trainspotting he re-voiced his commentary of Archie Gemmill's famous goal for Scotland against the Netherlands at the 1978 World Cup as a sex scene unfolded at the same time, both pieces of action climaxing simultaneously. He was also the regular figure of the BBC TV network's sport coverage. He had appeared on Grandstand for the Scottish football league results and presented some sports bulletin in Breakfast Time when Bob Wilson or David Icke was on the day-off. He also occasionally commentated on matches in England for the network especially when the television rights to Scottish Cup belonged to Scottish Television in 1988–90.

His popularity saw him elected as Rector of the University of Edinburgh in 1985, defeating Teddy Taylor, Margo MacDonald and Richard Demarco.

Awards
Macpherson was recognised at the 2005 Scottish BAFTA ceremony, picking up a prize for "Special Contribution to Scottish Broadcasting".

Modern day 

Macpherson's last regular role was commentating on STV's coverage of UEFA Champions League and UEFA Cup matches involving Scottish teams. Archie also became famous for his appearances on STV's Scotsport, which aired highlights from the Scottish Premier League (SPL) on Monday nights during the football season, until its axe in 2008.

Macpherson provides match predictions and analysis for betting-shop chain Ladbrokes.

Macpherson is also an accomplished writer, and has penned a best-selling biography of Scottish football manager Jock Stein, and Flower of Scotland? about Archie's trials and tribulations whilst following Scottish football for the past four decades. A Game of Two-Halves : The Autobiography followed in 2009, and in 2014, he returned to fiction with the adventure novel Silent Thunder.

In 2020, Macpherson's latest non-fiction title More Than A Game: Living with the Old Firm was published by Luath Press.

Works 

 Jock Stein: The Definitive Biography
 Flower of Scotland?
 Action Replays (1991)
 A Game of Two-Halves : The Autobiography (2009)
 Silent Thunder (2014)
More Than A Game: Living with the Old Firm, Luath Press, 2020,

References 
More Than a Game on Amazon

Silent Thunder at Amazon

External links 
Archie Macpherson Luath Press Author's Page
Archie Macpherson Tribute website
Archie MacPherson YouTube Tribute channel
 Archie Macpherson author's page at Amazon

Journalists from Glasgow
Scottish association football commentators
Scottish sportswriters
Rectors of the University of Edinburgh
1937 births
Living people
Scottish Football Hall of Fame inductees